Firuzabad-e Pain (also Romanized as Fīrūzābād-e Pā’īn) is a village in Forumad Rural District, in the Central District of Meyami County, Semnan Province, Iran. At the 2006 census, its population was 398, in 120 families.

References 

Populated places in Meyami County